Paolo Graziosi (25 January 1940 – 1 February 2022) was an Italian stage and film actor.

Biography
Born in Rimini, Graziosi was rejected for the admission exams at the Academy of Dramatic Arts Silvio D'Amico in 1961. He then enrolled at the Centro Sperimentale di Cinematografia. In theater, after a period of apprenticeship, he had his first break in 1965 with the role of Mercutio in a famous version of Romeo and Juliet directed by Franco Zeffirelli. In cinema, in which he had made his debut the 1962 drama film Gli arcangeli, his breakout role was an accountant named Carlo in China is Near by Marco Bellocchio (who had been his classmate in the Centro Sperimentale and that had previously directed him in the 1962 short film Ginepro fatto uomo). From then on, Graziosi continued appearing in films and television series, usually in secondary roles, but from seventies he focused his activities on stage, co-founding with Carlo Cecchi "GranTeatro", a company mainly active in alternative circuits.

Graziosi, who was battling cancer, died of COVID-19 in Vicenza on 1 February 2022, at the age of 82.

Selected filmography

 A Gangstergirl (1966)
 China is Near (1968)
 Galileo (1968)
 Cuore di mamma (1969)
 Illustrious Corpses (1976)
 Merry Christmas... Happy New Year (1989)
 The Conviction (1991)
 A Simple Story (1991)
 Louis, the Child King (1993)
 The Long Silence (1993)
 Fallen Heroes (2007)
 Il divo (2008)
 Giovanna's Father (2008)
 Italian Race (2016)
 Pinocchio (2019)
 The Bad Poet (2020)
 Three Floors (2021)

References

External links

1940 births
2022 deaths
Italian male film actors
People from Rimini
Centro Sperimentale di Cinematografia alumni
Deaths from the COVID-19 pandemic in Veneto